Victory Playground known as VPG is a playground located in Hyderabad, India. It has playing areas for cricket, volleyball, basketball, skating etc. It is popular during school vacations for its summer camps in sports and games.

History
VPG was opened in 1972 and is located at Chaderghat in Hyderabad.

Cricket
There are cricket training nets and they are popular during the summer.

Volleyball
Volleyball courts are popular with the professionals as well as the beginners. Summer camp is very popular among children.

Basketball
Basketball court is popular for its training especially during summer.

Sport in Hyderabad, India
Sports venues in Hyderabad, India
Football venues in Telangana
Sports venues in Telangana
Cricket grounds in Telangana
Sports venues completed in 1972
1972 establishments in Andhra Pradesh
20th-century architecture in India